Campylorhaphion famelicum is a species of sea snail, a marine gastropod mollusk in the family Eulimidae. The species is one of two known species to exist within the genus, Campylorhaphion, the other being Campylorhaphion machaeropse.

Distribution
This species is located in the following areas:
 European waters (ERMS scope)
 United Kingdom Exclusive Economic Zone

References

Eulimidae
Gastropods described in 1883